Fir Tree may refer to:

A tree of the genus fir
Fir Tree, County Durham, a village in England
Fir Tree, Washington, an unincorporated community in the United States

See also
Dennert Fir Tree, a signboard used in the Harz mountains in Germany
Fir Tree Copse, a nature reserve in Surrey, England
The Fir-Tree